Gilligan and Stevens Block is a historic commercial building located at Ticonderoga in Essex County, New York.  It was built in two parts between 1882 and 1884 and is a three-story, eight bay wide structure with Italianate and Queen Anne style features.  The east part of the block features five cast iron columns at the street level.

It was listed on the National Register of Historic Places in 1988.

References

Commercial buildings on the National Register of Historic Places in New York (state)
Queen Anne architecture in New York (state)
Italianate architecture in New York (state)
Houses completed in 1884
Buildings and structures in Essex County, New York
National Register of Historic Places in Essex County, New York